Klob may refer to:

 Klob (card game), alternative name for the card game of Clabber
 KLOB, a local radio station in California